The Doris Bither case, also known as the Entity haunting, was a 1974 investigation into alleged paranormal phenomena in Culver City, California, experienced by a woman named Doris Bither. The case inspired Frank De Felitta's 1978 book The Entity which was made into a 1982 film of the same name starring Barbara Hershey.

Background 
Doris Bither contacted parapsychologist Barry Taff in 1974 to relate alarming phenomena she experienced. At the time, Taff was working in the now defunct parapsychology lab run by Thelma Moss at the University of California, Los Angeles. With the assistance of Kerry Gaynor, Taff conducted a preliminary interview of Bither's paranormal claims. This interview revealed Bither had a history of physical and substance abuse along with a traumatic childhood. Investigators also found that Bither and her four children were living illegally in a condemned home that was in severe disrepair. Bither alleged she was attacked and raped by one or several invisible entities. More benign manifestations recounted by Bither included luminous, transparent human shapes and poltergeist events.

Bither died in 1999.

Investigation
Taff and Gaynor visited the Culver City house for the first time on August 22, 1974, with repeated visits over a ten-week period. The investigators did not look into the spectral rape allegation, as the alleged violence preceded their involvement in the case and Taff himself believes such incidents did not occur.

During the course of their visits, investigators noted what Taff called poltergeist activity: objects falling from shelves by themselves, strange lights, bad odors and cold zones in the house. The researchers indicated that those occurrences decreased over the course of the visits. They were joined in their visits by an acquaintance of Bither's who said she could communicate with spirits, as well as a large number of people related to the laboratory, or to Taff and Gaynor in one way or another, but Taff and Gaynor (in addition to Bither herself) are the only ones who offered a description of unusual occurrences.

Photographs of what appears to be lights are the only objective evidence gathered in the course of the visits. The images were taken by both Taff and Gaynor with an instant film Polaroid SX-70 camera and a 35 mm camera. The investigators indicated they encountered moving balls of light, but what the images show takes a different appearance: a static, circular band of light; an irregular bright line; and shapeless overexposed areas. Taff and Gaynor brought an infrared camera, but accidentally overexposed the film, rendering it unusable.

An analysis of the photographs attributed the result to common photography mistakes, such as a thin object close to the camera, or accidental manipulation of the exposure dial. In the case of the 35 mm pictures, mishaps in the development process may yield results similar to what is shown. Even if those mistakes are discounted, none of the lighter areas on the photographs are consistent with the trail a moving light would leave on photographic material.

Based on Bither's story, his own observations, and the photographs, Taff concluded paranormal phenomena must have been involved, calling the case a haunting. Reviewing the case four decades later, investigator Benjamin Radford concluded the case likely involves a distressed family, poor investigation techniques and confirmation bias.

See also 

 List of haunted locations

References 

American ghosts
History of Culver City, California
1974 in California